The University of Western Australia (UWA) Library consists of five library sites both on and within walking distance of the campus. The library is an integral part of the UWA student experience and provides a wide range of services, facilities and resources to both students and staff and the community including teaching, learning and research support, student IT support, and individual and collaborative learning spaces.

History 
When the University of Western Australia began teaching students in 1913 and the first building was constructed at the Irwin Street site, just £2000 was set aside for the purchase of roughly 100 books. By the time the campus moved to Crawley, there were over 10,000 volumes and a dedicated librarian.

The next thirty years saw steady but modest growth in the collections. Library services at Crawley initially operated out of the Main Library which was set up in a wing of the Administration building (now the Visitors Centre). By the early 1960s, overcrowding had become a significant issue leading to the Winthrop Hall Undercroft being enclosed and then re-opened as a temporary library annex consisting of the Reserve collection for undergraduates and bound volumes of periodicals. It was not until Leonard Jolley became the University Librarian in 1959 that the library began to expand its collections rapidly, to experiment with new forms of information technology, to erect major new library buildings, and to bring departmental libraries under central responsibility.

A Music branch library had been set up as early as 1935, many years before the UWA Music department was established. In the 1960s, the library was named the Wigmore Music Library following substantial gifts from violinist Alice Ivy Wigmore in honor of her mother. A purpose-built building for the Wigmore Music Library was opened in 1976, including discussion rooms and areas for informal study.  This library building was repurposed in 2020 by the UWA Conservatorium of Music as a space for practice and performance, and is now called the Wigmore Music Studio. The Music Library collection, now housed in Reid Library, includes scores, performing editions of musical works, sound-recordings, DVDs/videos, reference books, and scholarly journals.

Technological improvements became even more significant in the 1980s as Arthur Ellis, Jolley's successor as University Librarian, worked to expand the collections of audio-visual and electronic materials and began the process of computerising the library's catalogues.

By 2000, the library consisted of 11 library sites. The 2000s–2010s saw the introduction of online information literacy delivery, a Course Materials Online (CMO) service and the launch of OneSearch, the library's single search tool for finding books, journal articles and online resources.

A steady increase in the number of UWA students owning laptops and tablets resulted in demand for student IT support and for the first time in Semester 1, 2013, students could go to the information desks in the libraries for assistance with Pheme passwords, Unifi connections, Learning Management System (LMS) troubleshooting, online class registrations (OLCR) and other university applications and systems.

University librarians 

There have been six university librarians at UWA since 1927 when Malvina Evelyn Wood became the first female university librarian in Australia.

 Malvina Evelyn Wood (1927 – 1959)
 Leonard Jolley (1959 – 1979)
 Arthur Ellis (1980 – 1995)
 John Arfield (1996 – 2010)
 Dr Mary Davies (2010 – 2014)
 Jill Benn (2014 – present)

Buildings

Reid Library

Named after Sir Alexander Reid (UWA Chancellor 1956–1968), the Reid Library opened its doors to readers in February 1964, with its official opening taking place the following May. The building opened to widespread acclaim, winning the Royal Institute of British Architects (RIBA) 1964 Bronze Medal and being generally regarded as one of the most attractive university buildings in Australia.

When it opened in 1964, the Reid Library had 800 desks, and attracted 841,609 visitors in its first year. By August 1965, opening hours had been extended to reflect student demand and the building was subsequently extended during 1971–1972 to provide even more desks. Since then, the Reid Library has continued to adapt to changing student needs and radical technological changes by offering 24/7 building access, flexible student spaces and joint study skills drop-in sessions with Student Services.

In 2016, the bulk of the library's print collection was moved to storage, with the reclaimed space converted to a combination of study and social spaces, as well as a cafeteria.

Barry J Marshall Library

The Barry J Marshall Library opened at the southern end of the campus in 2008, combining the collections from the former Biological Sciences Library, Mathematics and Physical Sciences Library, psychology and geography and offering almost 1000 seats and 200 computers. The flexible and collaborative learning spaces were particularly popular with students who embraced the new library by creating online videos and Facebook fan pages. The Barry J Marshall Library is currently trialling a 3D printer.

The library is named after UWA alumnus and Nobel Prize winner, Barry Marshall.

Beasley Law Library

A branch law library was set up at UWA in 1928, the year after the Law Faculty was established. The early Law collection was mainly built by the first Chair of Law at UWA, Professor Beasley, who the library building was subsequently named after when it opened in 1967. Refurbishments to the Beasley Law Library in late 2005 were a response to the changing needs of law students and included a more open and welcoming entrance, increased access to computers (including after-hours access), and additional collaborative working areas.

Education, Fine Arts and Architecture (EDFAA) Library

The Education, Fine Arts and Architecture (EDFAA) Library is located on the Nedlands campus and was opened in 1993.

The EDFAA Library sustained significant flood damage during the 2010 Western Australian storms which resulted in nearly 12,000 items in the collection being ruined. The new EDFAA Library, which was re-opened in February 2012, was designed by UWA graduate Honey Hiranandani and includes group study rooms with multimedia equipment for student collaboration, a teaching room for flexible learning and RFID technology for self-service loans.

J Robin Warren Library

The J Robin Warren Library (formerly known as Medical and Dental Library) is located on Monash Avenue next to the Oral Health Centre of Western Australia and the Queen Elizabeth II Medical Centre. The opening of the library at the end of 2001 brought together the collections which had outgrown the spaces available at the Medical Library on the Queen Elizabeth II Hospital site and the Dental Library housed in the Perth Dental Hospital. At the time of its official opening in April 2002 by Sir Ronald Wilson, it was recognised as the largest medical and dental collection in Western Australia. The library is named after Professor (John) Robin Warren, a co-recipient, with Professor Barry J Marshall, of the Nobel Prize for Medicine in 2005 for their discovery that stomach ulcers were caused by the bacteria Helicobacter pylori.

Special Collections

The library's Special Collections are housed on the second floor of the Reid Library building and focus on Australian literature and the history of the Indian Ocean Region. The Australian literature collection includes more than 700 volumes of poetry by Western Australian writers and personal papers from many well-known Australian authors including A.B. Facey, Arthur Upfield, Robert Drewe, John Kinsella, Tracy Ryan, Dave Warner, Dennis Haskell and Peter Cowan. The archives of the literary magazine Westerly are also available.

Special Collections houses many rare materials including the papers of Henry Dundas, 1st Viscount Melville which contain more than 2,000 pages of correspondence and documents relating to the East India Company and Indian trade in the later 18th century, and an original 1650 map of the southern ocean, Polus Antarcticus by Dutch cartographer Jan Jansson.

The Indian Ocean collections also include the Frank Broeze Memorial Library which contains a considerable amount of Dutch and German material on maritime history and shipping, and the Erulkar Collection focused on the history of the Eastern Indian Ocean region, especially the maritime history of India.

The Friends of the UWA Library

The Friends of the UWA Library held their inaugural meeting in Winthrop Hall on July 25, 1965. Later that year, Sir Walter Murdoch became the patron and they hosted their first talk with Mr G.G. Allen presenting on 'Old Books in a Modern Library'. Over the years, the Friends have been supporters of the library and have donated many rare and valuable items for Special Collections in the Reid Library.

Digital research initiatives

The library developed and manages the UWA Research Repository which is an open access platform to capture, store, index, and distribute globally a wide range of research outputs produced by the university's researchers and postgraduate students. It contains peer-reviewed journal articles, book chapters, books, conference papers and creative works as well as UWA theses (masters and doctorate degrees by research).

The library (previously, as Information Services) developed two digital services for the management of research data:
 The Institutional Research Data Store (IRDS) provides researchers with a centralised, secure and UWA-supported data storage facility in which to store electronic research data, enabling ongoing access to these assets. This service is now managed by Information Governance Services (IGS); and
 Research Data Online (RDO) provides open or mediated access to research datasets held at the University of Western Australia.

Australian digital initiatives

The library has also developed or contributed to the following Australian digital services:
 Management of Australian National Data Service (ANDS) projects and contribution to Research Data Australia;
 AustLit is a resource for information about Australian literature, for which the UWA Library is the Western Australian node;
 Australian Data Archive;
 Guide to Australian Literary Manuscripts: a collection of more than eighty finding aids for literary manuscript collections in major Australian research libraries (using Encoded Archival Description); and
 HuNI (Humanities Networked Infrastructure) Virtual Laboratory.

References

External links 
 
 facebook.com
 twitter.com
 youtube.com
 AustLit
  Australian Data Archive

University of Western Australia
Western Australia
Crawley, Western Australia
Library buildings completed in 1964
Libraries in Perth, Western Australia